ISO 3166-2:BT is the entry for Bhutan in ISO 3166-2, part of the ISO 3166 standard published by the International Organization for Standardization (ISO), which defines codes for the names of the principal subdivisions (e.g., provinces or states) of all countries coded in ISO 3166-1.

Currently for Bhutan, ISO 3166-2 codes are defined for 20 districts.

Each code consists of two parts, separated by a hyphen. The second part is two digits, except Gasa and Trashi Yangtse, which use two letters instead. The first digit indicates the zone where the district is in:
 1: Western
 2: Central (Gasa is also in this zone)
 3: Southern
 4: Eastern (Trashi Yangtse is also in this zone)

Current codes
Subdivision names are listed as in the ISO 3166-2 standard published by the ISO 3166 Maintenance Agency (ISO 3166/MA).

Click on the button in the header to sort each column.

 Notes

Changes
The following changes to the entry are listed on ISO's online catalogue, the Online Browsing Platform:

See also
 Subdivisions of Bhutan
 FIPS region codes of Bhutan

External links
 ISO Online Browsing Platform: BT
 Districts of Bhutan, Statoids.com

2:BT
ISO 3166-2
Bhutan geography-related lists